Wyoming Highway 337 (WYO 337), also known as Fort Road, is a  east-west state highway in Sheridan County, Wyoming, United States, that connects the Sheridan Veterans Administration Medical Center (northwest of Sheridan) with Interstate 90 Business Loop/U.S. Route 14/U.S. Route 87 (I-90 BL/US 14/US 87, North Main Street) in Sheridan.

Route description
WYO 337 serves the Sheridan VA Medical Center, which is located at the site of the former Fort Mackenzie.

WYO 337 begins at the southeast corner of the VA Hospital Campus at the intersection of Freedom Lane/Army Lane and Navy Lane. (Freedom lane heads west along the southern edge of campus and Army Layne heads north along the east edge of campus, while Navy Lane continues northwest through the main part of campus.) From its western terminus, WYO 337 heads southeast for about  before turning easterly. Very shortly after entering the city, WYO 337 connect with the north end of Dana Avenue (Sheridan County Road 80) and then crosses over Big Goose Creek. The highway then connects with the north end of Frackelton Street (which runs about four blocks south to end at Thorne-Rider Park). After connecting with the north end of Val Vista Street, WYO 337 reaches its eastern terminus at North Main Street (I-90 Bus/US 14/US 87) at T intersection, roughly  after entering Sheridan. (From WYO 337's eastern terminus I-90 BL/US 14/US 87 heads north toward an interchange with Interstate 90 and Wyoming Highway 338, and then on to Ranchester and Billings, Montana. I-90 BL/US 14/US 87 heads south, through Sheridan, toward Banner, Ucross, and Buffalo.)

Major intersections

See also

 List of state highways in Wyoming

References

External links

 Wyoming Highway 337

Transportation in Sheridan County, Wyoming
337